Saysunee Jana (born 15 June 1974) is a Thai wheelchair fencer. She is Thailand's first female Paralympic gold medallist when she won the Épée B event at the 2004 Athens Paralympics. She has won two gold, one silver, and three bronze in total from five appearances at the Paralympic Games.

Biography
When she was 17, Jana was in a motorcycle crash which resulted in her breaking her back and leaving both of her legs paralysed.

Jana first participated in the Paralympic Games in 2004 where she won a gold medal in the Épée B event and a bronze medal in the Foil B event. She won another bronze medal at the 2008 games, a gold medal at the 2012 games and a silver medal at the 2016 games, all of which were in Épée B events. She was also the flag bearer for Thailand at the opening ceremony of the 2012 Paralympic Games in London.

References

External links
 
 

Saysunee Jana
Saysunee Jana
Saysunee Jana
Saysunee Jana
Saysunee Jana
Paralympic medalists in wheelchair fencing
Medalists at the 2004 Summer Paralympics
Medalists at the 2008 Summer Paralympics
Medalists at the 2012 Summer Paralympics
Medalists at the 2016 Summer Paralympics
Medalists at the 2020 Summer Paralympics
Wheelchair fencers at the 2004 Summer Paralympics
Wheelchair fencers at the 2008 Summer Paralympics
Wheelchair fencers at the 2012 Summer Paralympics
Wheelchair fencers at the 2016 Summer Paralympics
Wheelchair fencers at the 2020 Summer Paralympics
1974 births
Living people
Saysunee Jana
Saysunee Jana